The 1958 Texas Tech Red Raiders football team represented Texas Technological College—now known as Texas Tech University—as an independent during the 1958 NCAA University Division football season. In their eighth season under head coach DeWitt Weaver, the Red Raiders compiled a 3–7 record and were outscored by opponents by a combined total of 163 to 126. The team's statistical leaders included Jerry Bell with 435 passing yards, Ronnie Rice with 263 rushing yards, and Floyd Dellinger with 231 receiving yards. The team played its home games at Clifford B. and Audrey Jones Stadium.

Schedule

References

Texas Tech
Texas Tech Red Raiders football seasons
Texas Tech Red Raiders football